WKSC (1300 AM) was a radio station licensed to Kershaw, South Carolina, United States. The station was owned by J. Stanley Griffin, through licensee Sound Ideas, LLC.

The station was an affiliate of Scott Shannon's The True Oldies Channel from ABC Radio.  It is no longer listed on the website.

On May 17, 2010, WKSC returned to the air with talk.  On January 22, 2013, WKSC went silent. The station's license was cancelled by the Federal Communications Commission on April 21, 2014.

References

External links

KSC
News and talk radio stations in the United States
Defunct radio stations in the United States
Radio stations disestablished in 2014
2014 disestablishments in South Carolina
KSC